Caroline Ayres (born 9 October 1981) is a player for England women's national basketball team. She played for the team at the 2006 Commonwealth Games.

References

External links
 Eurobasket player profile

1981 births
Living people
English women's basketball players
Place of birth missing (living people)